Theodora Anna Mathilde Julie Rosenquist (8 May 1896 – 26 July 1959), known as Thea Rosenquist, was a German stage and film actress. She acted in several Austrian silent films, and was considered a replacement for Liane Haid. She married industrialist Leon Joseph Koerner (or Körner) in 1923, and settled down in Vienna and Prague. 

Rosenquist was of Jewish origin and had to escape following the Nazi takeovers of Austria and Czechoslovakia. She went to the Netherlands, on to Britain before finally settling down in Canada. Several of her family members were killed in the Holocaust.

Rosenquist and her husband established a charitable foundation, the Leon and Thea Koerner Foundation, in 1955. The Thea Koerner House Graduate Student Centre of the University of British Columbia was named in her honour.

The Koerner House, Leon and Thea Koerner's residence in Palm Springs, California, was designed by master architect E. Stewart Williams in 1955.

Notable films
Rosenquist played Rahel in 1919's The Jewess of Toledo and starred as Baronesse Tirnau in the 1922 biopic, Ludwig II.

References

Bibliography
 Dassanowsky, Robert. Austrian Cinema: A History. McFarland & Company Incorporated Pub, 2005.

External links

1896 births
1959 deaths
Jewish emigrants from Nazi Germany to Canada
German stage actresses
German film actresses
German silent film actresses
Actors from Lübeck
Jewish emigrants from Austria after the Anschluss
Jewish Canadian actresses
Jewish Canadian philanthropists
20th-century German actresses
20th-century philanthropists